Grass Valley may refer to:

Places
 Grass Valley, Western Australia, a small town in the Avon Valley

United States
 Grass Valley, Oregon, a city in Sherman County
 Grass Valley (Piute and Sevier counties, Utah), a valley in Piute and southern Sevier counties in central Utah

California, Nevada, Utah, Colorado
 Roman Catholic Diocese of Grass Valley, a former diocese based in the eponymous California city in Nevada County, formerly covering Northeastern California and most of Nevada; most of Utah, and part of Colorado

State of California
 Grass Valley, California, a city in Nevada County
 Grass Valley, Oakland, California, a neighborhood
 Grass Valley Wilderness, a wilderness area in the Mojave Desert managed by the BLM

State of Nevada
 Grass Valley, Nevada, census-designated place in Pershing County
 Grass Valley (Eureka and Lander counties, Nevada), a valley in Nevada
 Grass Valley (Pershing and Humboldt counties, Nevada), a valley in Nevada

Other uses
 Grass Valley (company), a television and film technology company

See also
 Grass Valley speckled dace, an extinct species of fish
 Little Grass Valley, California, a census-designated place in Plumas County